The Belgian State Railways Type 51 was a class of  steam locomotives for shunting and local train service, introduced in 1866.

Construction history
The locomotives were built by various manufacturers from 1866 to 1905.
The machines had an outside frame with the cylinders located inside the frame.
During the extended period of time in which these machines were built they underwent various changes, e.g. in the design of the water tanks, shelter, boiler and overall length.

References

Bibliography

0-6-0T locomotives
Steam locomotives of Belgium
Standard gauge locomotives of Belgium
C n2t locomotives
Railway locomotives introduced in 1866
Shunting locomotives